The blue sucker (Cycleptus elongatus) is a long-lived freshwater species of fish in the sucker family that is of conservation concern. The species has an average weight of 2-3 kilograms and an average length of 76 centimeters. The record length has been recorded at 102 centimeters, and individuals have been documented beyond 40 years of age.

Description
Color is variable, from light steel-gray to almost jet black in the spring.  The fish is streamlined, with an inferior mouth and a small/slender head that tapers to a fleshy snout. The mouth location allows the fish to feed off the bottom of its habitat. The body of this fish is elongated and slightly compressed. It has a long falcate dorsal fin which is elevated anterior with 24-35 rays. It has a long caudal peduncle and a forked caudal fin. The anal fin contains 7-8 rays on average. The scales are large and contain 55-58 along the lateral line.

Range and distribution
The blue sucker is native to the United States and Mexico. In the U.S., it lives in the Mississippi River basin north to Minnesota and Wisconsin. The Blue Sucker also lives in the Missouri River drainage to North Dakota and South Dakota and Montana. This species can also be found in the Gulf drainage from the Sabine River to the Rio Grande.

Habitat
Huge migrations of these fast, powerful fish once migrated throughout the Mississippi River basin, and spring harvests of blue sucker were a staple food for early pioneers.  Blue suckers are very rare today, thought to be due to the segmentation of habitat caused by the thousands of dams which have been built in the last century.  Blues frequent the thalweg of large river systems, in heavy current.

Diet
Blue suckers obtain their food off the bottom of rivers and other bodies of freshwater through a mouth in the inferior position. Some organisms that they eat are aquatic insect larvae, crustaceans, plant materials and algae.

Reproduction
The blue sucker has a spawning time from around March until June. This varies on the location of the fish and also the water temperature. Fifty-three degrees is the average water temperature in which males and females find their spawning area. This area is in fast moving water around two feet deep. Rocks in the area will also be larger than gravel, but they will be smaller than boulders. The peak water temperature is sixty-two degrees and the actual spawning time will usually last around two weeks. Male suckers will continue to come to the area until spawning is officially over. Females will go to the area, lay her eggs, and leave once she is finished and they have been fertilized. Recent evidence indicates their recruitment patterns are episodic, and their life history is longer-lived than previously realized.

Conservation
The blue sucker is sensitive to water pollution, and is only able to live in water that is well irrigated or pollution-less. This is why it is common to see them in rivers. The species is imperiled in numerous US states, and its conservation status in other states is likely in need of revision.

Trivia
The blue sucker also goes by the name blackhorse, the bluefish, the razor back, the sockerel, the gourd seed sucker, the Missouri Sucker, the slenderhead sucker, and the sweet sucker.

Etymology
"Cycleptus" is a Greek word meaning circular or slender. "Elongatus" is a Latin word meaning elongated.

References

 
 NatureServe - Cycleptus elongatus
 Fishes of Minnesota - Blue sucker
 roughfish.com - Blue sucker
 

Catostomidae
Fish of North America
Fish described in 1817
Freshwater fish of North America